The Connect User Community is a 501(c)(6) nonprofit association, an independent user community for Hewlett Packard Enterprise (HPE).

Connect is a group of more than 70,000 HP customers, partners and employees. It resulted from the merger in May, 2008 of previous HP user groups, being Encompass, HP-Interex, and ITUG. It engages its members through education, community, philanthropy, and advocacy in a partnership with HPE. Connect members provide feedback and direction to HPE and their partners through their advocacy channels.

This community of IT professionals makes available information about technology solutions for complex and multi-system computing environments, focusing on HP technologies, including HP-UX, HP's NonStop, Blade, HPE Helion, Enterprise Storage, Enterprise Unix, OpenVMS, Linux and Windows. Tru64 UNIX was removed from the supported product list at 31 December 2012.

History

Different users organizations have been instrumental as to the development of technology in the minicomputer business (departmental computing). They survived multiple mergers and takeovers, as well as multiple hardware platforms and software platforms. They organized self-service and mutual support amongst customers to complement the official vendor support.

Traditionally, physical meetings and conferences were organized; since 2008 more online communities were formed. Universities were offered a collaboration agreement for research and development.

References

External links 
 Connect User Community

Archived 
 HP Technology Forum & Expo
 OpenVMS.org
 Tru64.org

Hewlett-Packard
Computer clubs